Shesh Bahreh-ye Mianeh (also Romanized as Shesh Bahreh-ye Mīāneh; also known as Shesh Bahreh-ye Aḩmadī) is a village in Milas Rural District, in the Central District of Lordegan County, Chaharmahal and Bakhtiari Province, Iran. At the 2006 census, its population was 1,120, in 198 families.

References 

Populated places in Lordegan County